These hits topped the Dutch Top 40 in 1995 (see 1995 in music).

See also
1995 in music

1995 in the Netherlands
1995 record charts
1995